William Richardson (1690–1755) was the Member of Parliament for Augher, Ireland, from 1737 to 1755.

References

1690 births
1755 deaths
Members of the Parliament of Ireland (pre-1801) for County Tyrone constituencies
Irish MPs 1727–1760